Duiven is a municipality and a town in the eastern Netherlands. Duiven's name can be translated into English to mean "pigeons" or "doves". Although the coat of arms and logo of the municipality feature pigeons, the name is etymologically related to "dunes" (Dutch: duinen). The flag of the municipality of Duiven was granted and adopted on 25 June 1954.

Population centres 
Villages:
 Duiven
 Groessen
 Loo

Hamlets:
 De Eng
 Helhoek
 Nieuwgraaf

Topography

Dutch Topographic map of the municipality of Duiven, June 2015

Transportation
Duiven railway station is served by trains from Arnhem to Doetinchem and Winterswijk.

On weekdays there are 4 trains per hour between Arnhem and Doetinchem, with two of these continuing to Winterswijk. On weekends there are 2 trains per hour between Arnhem and Winterswijk.

Notable people 
 Dean Koolhof (born 1994) a Dutch professional footballer, with over 100 club caps, plays for Helmond Sport

Twin towns 
Duiven is twinned with:

Gallery

References

External links

Official website

 
Municipalities of Gelderland
Populated places in Gelderland